Valeriodoce Esporte Clube, commonly known as Valério, is a Brazilian football club based in Itabira, Minas Gerais state. They competed in the Série B and in the Série C once.

History
The club was founded on November 22, 1942. Valério won the Campeonato Mineiro Second Level in 1964. They competed in the Série B in 1988 and in the Série C in 1993, but failed to gain promotion in both seasons.

Achievements

 Campeonato Mineiro Second Level:
 Winners (1): 1964

Stadium
Valeriodoce Esporte Clube play their home games at Estádio Israel Pinheiro. The stadium has a maximum capacity of 4,500 people.

References

Association football clubs established in 1942
Football clubs in Minas Gerais
1942 establishments in Brazil